Domohani Railway Station  is the railway station which lies on the bank of River Teesta and serves the town of Domohani, the other station is  which lies in New Jalpaiguri–New Bongaigaon section of Barauni–Guwahati line. This station lies in  Jalpaiguri district in the Indian state of West Bengal. The station lies on New Mal–Changrabandha–New Cooch Behar line of Northeast Frontier Railway, Alipurduar railway division. Some local trains like Siliguri Bamanhat DEMU, Siliguri New Bongaigaon DEMU, Siliguri Dhubri DEMU etc are available from this station daily.

References

Railway stations in Jalpaiguri district
Alipurduar railway division
Railway stations in West Bengal